Robinson: La Gran Aventura 2002 was the second season of the Venezuelan version of the Swedish show Expedition Robinson and it aired in 2002. Unlike any previous season, this season took place in a Patagonian Mountain (Argentina). During the premerge portion of the game, the South team dominated at the immunity challenges, winning all five, while the North team lost most of its members. Due to the numbers gap of 8–3 between the two tribes, they were merged when there were eleven players left in the game. Following the merger, the former South team members began to turn against each other leading to five of its former members being voted out of the competition. Following the elimination of the first jury member Carlos Correa, the black vote came into play. The black vote gave the person eliminated at one tribal council the power to vote at the next. When it came time for the final four, the contestants competed in two challenges. The winner of the first challenge, Raúl Arreaza, had to vote out one of the losers. He chose to eliminate the only member of the North team remaining in the game, Alfredo Gago. The final three then took part in a final challenge in which the loser would be eliminated. Alberto Vincentelli lost the challenge and was eliminated from the game. Ultimately, it was Graciela Boza won this season over Raúl Arreaza with a jury vote of 4–3.

Finishing order

Voting history

 At the first tribal council both Maria Elena and Beatriz received four votes. Following a re-vote, Maria Elena received more votes than Beatriz and was eliminated.

 Starting with the ninth tribal council and continuing until the twelfth tribal council, the contestant voted out at the previous tribal council was permitted to vote.

External links
https://web.archive.org/web/20030429233550/http://www.robinsonlagranaventura.com.ve/versiones/v2_2/participantes/index.asp (Official Site Archive)

V
Venezuelan reality television series
Television shows filmed in Argentina